Beverley Wilson (born 1 January 1949 in Sydney, New South Wales) is an Australian former cricket player. Wilson played two tests and six one day internationals for the Australia national women's cricket team.

Wilson was the captain of the New South Wales women's cricket team for three seasons from 1970/71 to 1973/74.

Bev Wilson's younger sister Debbie Wilson also played test and one day international cricket for Australia.

References

External links
 Bev Wilson at CricketArchive
 Beverley Wilson at southernstars.org.au

Living people
1949 births
Australia women Test cricketers
Australia women One Day International cricketers